Anton Resch (26 November 1921 – 16 July 1975) was a former Luftwaffe fighter ace and recipient of the Knight's Cross of the Iron Cross during World War II. The Knight's Cross of the Iron Cross was awarded to recognise extreme battlefield bravery or successful military leadership. Anton Resch was credited with 91 victories.

Career

He gained his first Soviet victory Il-2 Sturmovik over the Eastern Front on 21 October 1943. On 27 January 1944 he was seriously wounded by Russian fighters, but returned to duty in June of that same year. On 26 August he recorded seven Soviet victories and other seven on 31 August 1944. On 10 September 1944 was again wounded by Slovak insurgency flak. After the war Resch was handed over to Soviets and spent many years in Soviet captivity. Anton Resch was credited with 91 victories, 64 of them over the Eastern Front, including 24 Il-2 Sturmoviks and other 27 victories over the Western Front.

Awards
 Iron Cross (1939)
 2nd Class
 1st Class
 Wound Badge in Black
 Front Flying Clasp of the Luftwaffe in Gold
 German Cross in Gold on 1 January 1945 as Leutnant in the 3./Jagdgeschwader 52
 Knight's Cross of the Iron Cross on 7 April 1945 as Oberleutnant and Staffelkapitän of the 3./Jagdgeschwader 52

References

Citations

Bibliography

 
 
 
 

1921 births
1975 deaths
Luftwaffe pilots
German World War II flying aces
Recipients of the Gold German Cross
Recipients of the Knight's Cross of the Iron Cross
People from Stolberg (Rhineland)
Military personnel from North Rhine-Westphalia